The Edinburgh East by-election was a Parliamentary by-election held on 16 April 1909. The constituency returned one Member of Parliament (MP) to the House of Commons of the United Kingdom, elected by the first past the post voting system.

Vacancy
Sir George McCrae had been Liberal MP for the seat of Edinburgh East since the 1899 Edinburgh East by-election. He resigned from the House of Commons to take up a position in Scottish government service, accepting the appointment of Vice-President of the Scottish Local Government Board.

Electoral history
The seat had been won by a Liberal at every election since it was created in 1885. They easily held the seat at the last election, with an increased majority;

Candidates
The local Liberal Association selected 60-year-old James Gibson to defend the seat. He had been Lord Provost, of Edinburgh since 1906.
The Conservatives selected 29-year-old Patrick Ford as their candidate.

Campaign
Polling Day was fixed for 16 April 1909.

Result
The Liberal majority was only a ninth of their 1906 result. This was generally ascribed to the loss of the Roman Catholic vote because of the failure to settle the education question.;

Aftermath

References

Edinburgh East by-election
1900s elections in Scotland
Edinburgh East by-election
Edinburgh East by-election
East, 1909
1900s in Edinburgh